Lübz is a town in the Ludwigslust-Parchim district, in Mecklenburg-Western Pomerania, Germany. It is situated on the river Elde, 12 km northeast of Parchim. It is home to the Mecklenburgische Brauerei Lübz, the largest local employer and one of the larger regional breweries. The former municipality Gischow was merged into Lübz in May 2019.

Notable people
Wilhelm Ahrens (1872–1927), mathematician
 (born 1983), prizefighter
Otto-Heinrich Drechsler (1895–1945), Nazi politician who instigated the Holocaust in Latvia
 (born 1943), Hamburg-area politician (CDU)
 (1926–2001), actor
Johan Ludvig Holstein (1694–1763), Danish minister of state
 (born 1939), mathematician
Karin Strenz (1967–2021), politician (CDU)
Gerd Wessig (born 1959), East German high jumper
Gerald Weiß (1960–2018), East German javelin thrower

References

Cities and towns in Mecklenburg
Ludwigslust-Parchim
1456 establishments in Europe
Populated places established in the 1450s
Grand Duchy of Mecklenburg-Schwerin